Gamochaeta calviceps, the narrowleaf purple everlasting, is a species of flowering plant in the family Asteraceae. It is native to South America and to the southeastern United States (from Texas and Oklahoma to Virginia (though not Florida). It has also become naturalized in other places (Europe, Taiwan, New Zealand, California, etc.).

The plant forms many small flower heads in elongated arrays. Each head contains 2–4 purple disc flowers but no ray flowers. Flowers bloom April to July. It grows in fields, disturbed sites, flower beds, and edges of woods.

Gamochaeta calviceps is similar to G. falcata, and many G. calviceps specimens from the United States have long been misidentified as G. falcata.

References

calviceps
Flora of the United States
Flora of South America
Plants described in 1935
Taxa named by Ángel Lulio Cabrera